Ireland's Greatest was a 2010 public poll by Raidió Teilifís Éireann (RTÉ) and associated television documentary series broadcast on RTÉ One, where viewers voted to choose the greatest person in the history of Ireland.  The concept was based on the BBC series 100 Greatest Britons.  The winner was John Hume.

Format
To draw up an initial shortlist of 40 names, RTÉ commissioned an opinion poll of 1,000 members of the public, carried out by Ipsos MRBI in late 2009. The shortlist was published on 22 March 2010 on the RTÉ.ie website, and readers could vote for their preferred person for 12 days, ending on 2 April; one vote per IP address was permitted. The top ten was announced on The Tubridy Show with Myles Dungan on 5 April 2010.  The top five was established at this point, but not publicised until RTÉ's programming schedule for autumn 2010 was unveiled in August.  Each of the top five was profiled in a one-hour documentary programme broadcast in autumn 2010 and presented by a public figure advocating that person's claim to the title of "greatest person".  Viewers voted for the overall winner, announced on The Late Late Show on 22 October 2010.

Rankings

Top five
The ranking of the top five, and the advocates who each present a one-hour documentary about one of them, were as follows:

Top 40
The following people were shortlisted:

Criticism
The list of nominees for Ireland's Greatest was criticised by historians Diarmuid Ferriter, Tim Pat Coogan, and Maurice Manning, and Irish Times columnist Noel Whelan. They said that the list was skewed towards recent times, and that many nominees were celebrities from popular culture or sport rather than people who had made a lasting contribution to society; Ferriter said "It is going to be very hard to take this seriously for historians". Ryan Tubridy, who presents  The Late Late Show, commented, "There are some really silly names in there. It's contentious to say the least". Liam Dolan in the Sunday Independent called it "a shambolic litany of well-intentioned do-gooders and talented non-entities". People whose inclusion attracted criticism included  Stephen Gately, Louis Walsh and Daniel O'Donnell. The Belfast Telegraph noted the absence of Van Morrison and George Best; other absentees noted were Michael Davitt, John McCormack,  William Rowan Hamilton, Lady Gregory, and Samuel Beckett. Ken Sweeney in the Irish Independent criticised the ranking of Stephen Gately ahead of Éamon de Valera. The dearth of women —3 out of 40—  was also noted. Website science.ie responded to the lack of scientists on the RTÉ shortlist by organising its own poll for Ireland's greatest scientist, won by Robert Boyle.

Ireland's Greatest Women
In 2005, Marian Finucane's radio show organised a similar poll to find Ireland's greatest woman. There were some claims of ballot-stuffing. The top ten were:
 Nano Nagle, (1718-1784) founder of the Presentation Sisters
 Mary Robinson, (1944-) President of Ireland and UN High Commissioner for Human Rights
 Michelle Smith, (1969-) winner of three gold medals and a bronze medal in swimming at the 1996 Summer Olympics 
 Saint Brigid, (451–525) 4th/5th century abbess and one of Ireland's patron saints (many modern historians believe Brigid to be fictional)
 Grace O'Malley, (c.1530–c.1603) Galway pirate
 Christina Noble, (1944-) founder of the Christina Noble Children's Foundation
 Edel Quinn, (1907-1944) Catholic missionary
 Sophia McColgan, child abuse survivor
 Kathleen Lynn, (1874-1955) suffragette, Sinn Féin TD and Easter Rising participant
 Nora Herlihy, (1910–1988) co-founder of the Irish League of Credit Unions

Ireland's Greatest Sportsperson
In September 2009, RTÉ ran an online poll in sponsored by Paddy Power to nominate Ireland's greatest sportsperson. A shortlist of 32 names was selected by a panel of experts. The top ten was announced on 31 December 2009:
 Pádraig Harrington (1971-) (golf)
 Brian O'Driscoll (1979-) (rugby union)
 Joey Dunlop (1952-2000) (motorcycling)
 George Best (1946-2005) (soccer)
 Roy Keane (1971-) (soccer)
 Sean Kelly (1956-) (cycling)
 Sonia O'Sullivan (1969-) (athletics)
 Christy Ring (1920-1979) (hurling and Gaelic football)
 Vincent O'Brien (1917-2009) (horse racing)
 Paul McGrath (1959-) (soccer)

The other 22 were:
D. J. Carey,
Eamonn Coghlan,
Ronnie Delany,
Ken Doherty,
Mike Gibson,
Johnny Giles,
Kevin Heffernan,
Alex Higgins,
Jack Kyle,
Eddie Macken,
Tony McCoy,
Barry McGuigan,
Aidan O'Brien,
Mick O'Connell,
Christy O'Connor Snr,
Mick O'Dwyer,
Jack O'Shea,
Mary Peters,
Stephen Roche,
Henry Shefflin,
Michelle Smith, and
John Treacy.

Ireland's Greatest Scientist
In 2010, the website www.sfi.ie selected its Top 10 Irish scientists, in response to the exclusion of scientists from the RTÉ longlist.
Robert Boyle, (1627-1691) founder of modern chemistry and discover of Boyle's law
William Rowan Hamilton, (1805-1865) mathematician who developed Hamiltonian mechanics and discovered quaternions
Ernest Walton, (1903-1995) physicist who "split the atom"; at the time of broadcast, the only Irish Nobel laureate in a science (Physics, 1951)
Kathleen Lonsdale, (1903-1971) X-ray crystallographer who discovered the molecular structure of benzene and diamonds
Dorothy Price, (1890-1954) introduced the BCG tuberculosis vaccine to Ireland
John Tyndall, (1820-1893) physicist who studied radiant energy in air 
Harry Ferguson, (1884-1960) inventor of the modern tractor
George Gabriel Stokes, (1819-1903) physicist who worked in fluid dynamics, optics and mathematical physics; also discovered Stokes' theorem
Fr Nicholas Callan, (1799-1864) who invented the modern induction coil
Charles Algernon Parsons, (1854-1931) inventor of the steam turbine
William Thomson, 1st Baron Kelvin, (1824-1907) who formulated the first and second Laws of Thermodynamics

Other editions

Other countries have produced similar shows; see Greatest Britons spin-offs

References

External links
 Ireland's Greatest from RTÉ website

2010 Irish television series debuts
2010 Irish television series endings
Ireland
Television series about the history of Ireland
Irish documentary television series
Irish history television shows
Irish television series based on non-Irish television series
Irish television series based on British television series
Lists of Irish people
RTÉ-related lists
RTÉ original programming